Thomas Bursey (born ) is a South African rugby union player for the  in the Currie Cup and the Stormers. His regular position is scrum-half.

Bursey was named in the  squad for the 2021 Currie Cup Premier Division. He made his debut for the  against the British & Irish Lions during the 2021 British & Irish Lions tour to South Africa.

References

South African rugby union players
Living people
2000 births
Rugby union scrum-halves
Stormers players
Western Province (rugby union) players
Rugby union players from East London, Eastern Cape